Ludus may refer to:
 Ludus (ancient Rome) (plural ludi), several meanings around "play, game, sport, training"
Ludi, public games held for the benefit and entertainment of the Roman people
 Luduș, a town in Transylvania, Romania
 Ludus (love), a type of love/sex in the color wheel theory of love
 Ludus (band), a British post-punk band 1978–1983
 "Ludus", one of two movements in Tabula Rasa (Pärt), a 1977 musical composition by the Estonian composer Arvo Pärt

See also